Rio Grande do Norte is a state located in the Northeast Region of Brazil. It is home to cities such as Natal, Mossoró, and São Gonçalo do Amarante.

The land that became Rio Grande do Norte was a donatário to João de Barros, the factor of the House of India and Mina, from John III of Portugal in 1535; prior to that, the Portuguese Crown owned the land. The French, who trafficked Brazil wood in the area, had a foothold on the land until the Portuguese expelled them in 1598. The Dutch took the land in 1634 as a part of Dutch Brazil and reigned until 1654, when they were defeated by the Portuguese. In 1701, Rio Grande do Norte joined the Captaincy of Pernambuco, and became a province in 1822 and a state of Brazil in 1889.

Rio Grande do Norte is divided into 167 municipalities, which are grouped into four mesoregions and 23 microregions. Of the 167 municipalities, Natal has the highest population, with 803,811 inhabitants, while Viçosa, with 1,618 inhabitants, has the lowest.

Municipalities

See also
Geography of Brazil
List of cities in Brazil

References

Rio Grande do Norte